In mathematics, the q-Hahn polynomials  are a family of basic hypergeometric orthogonal polynomials in the basic Askey scheme.  give a detailed list of their properties.

Definition

The  polynomials are given in terms of basic hypergeometric functions by

Relation to other polynomials

q-Hahn polynomials→    Quantum q-Krawtchouk polynomials：

q-Hahn polynomials→  Hahn polynomials

make the substitution, into definition of q-Hahn polynomials, and find the limit q→1, we obtain

，which is exactly Hahn polynomials.

References

Orthogonal polynomials
Q-analogs
Special hypergeometric functions